The 2002 Illinois gubernatorial election occurred on November 5, 2002. Incumbent Republican governor George Ryan, who was plagued by scandal, did not run for a second term. Democrat Rod Blagojevich, a U.S. Congressman, ran against Republican Jim Ryan (no relation to the incumbent), the Illinois Attorney General. Blagojevich won 52% to 45%, becoming the first Democrat to win an election for governor since 1972. As of 2022 this is the last Illinois governor election where no candidate running was an incumbent.

Election information
The primaries and general elections coincided with those for federal elections (Senate and House), as well as those for other state offices. The election was part of the 2002 Illinois elections.

Turnout

For the primaries, turnout for the gubernatorial primaries was 30.81%, with 2,170,344 votes cast and turnout for the lieutenant gubernatorial primaries was 26.99% with 1,908,564 votes cast. For the general election, turnout was 50.05%, with 3,538,891 votes cast.

Democratic Primary

Governor

Candidates
Rod Blagojevich, U.S. Representative
Roland Burris, former Attorney General of Illinois, former Illinois State Comptroller, candidate for governor in 1994 and 1998 and independent candidate for Mayor of Chicago in 1995
Paul Vallas, former CEO of Chicago Public Schools

Results
The Democratic primary was a very close 3-way race. Blagojevich prevailed by just 25,469 votes, and just by 2.03%. Vallas did very well in the Chicago suburbs, and narrowly defeated Burris in Cook County, the most populous county in the state. Vallas led early on in the night with Burris in second and Blagojevich in third. Vallas had won probably the most vital county, Cook County. For Blagojevich to beat both opponents, he had to run the board through the rest of Illinois. Blagojevich won almost all of the state's rural counties. Eventually, Cook County had reported all of its votes, with a slight advantage for Vallas over Burris. However many votes were still left to be counted in other cities outside the Chicago area. Blagojevich managed to pull out a narrow victory by winning in Champaign County, home of Champaign. Blagojevich also did well in Sangamon County home to the state's capital, Springfield. Blagojevich also won St. Clair County home of East St. Louis. In the early morning the day after the election, Vallas realized that with all of Cook County's votes counted he had lost. At 4:18 in the morning, Vallas called Blagojevich and congratulated him, and pledged Blagojevich his full support for the general election.

Lieutenant governor

Candidates
F. Michael Kelleher, Jr.
Pat Quinn, former Treasurer of Illinois, nominee for Secretary of State in 1994 candidate for US Senate in 1996 candidate for Lieutenant Governor in 1998, perennial candidate
Joyce Washington, Nurse

Results

Republican primary

Governor

Candidates
Patrick O'Malley, State Senator
Jim Ryan, Attorney General of Illinois
Corrine Wood, Lieutenant Governor

Results

Lieutenant governor

Candidates
Carl Hawkinson, former State Representative and Knox County State's Attorney
Jack McInerney
William O'Connor
Charles Owens

Results

Libertarian nomination
In March 2002, the Libertarian Party of Illinois nominated Cal Skinner. Skinner had formerly served as a Republican state representative, and was a political conservative.

General election

Campaign
In the general election, Blagojevich defeated Republican Illinois Attorney General Jim Ryan by a solid margin. Ethics scandals had plagued the administration of incumbent Republican George Ryan, who was of no relation to Jim Ryan, and Blagojevich's campaign focused on the theme of "ending business as usual" in state government. During the campaign, Blagojevich played on the name of his opponent by asking "How can you replace one Ryan with another Ryan and call that change? You want change? Elect a guy named Blagojevich."

Predictions

Polling

Results
Although the election was thought to be a close one early on in the campaign, Blagojevich's big numbers out of Cook County were too much for the Republicans to come back from.

See also
Electoral history of Rod Blagojevich

Notes

References

Gubernatorial
Illinois
2002
Rod Blagojevich